Brad Farrow (born October 5, 1956 in Vancouver, British Columbia) is a retired judoka from Canada, who represented his native country at two Summer Olympics: 1976 and 1984. He twice won a gold medal at the Pan American Games during his career in the featherweight division (– 63 kg), in 1975 and 1979.

See also
Judo in Alberta
Judo in Canada
List of Canadian judoka

References
 

1956 births
Living people
Canadian male judoka
Judoka at the 1976 Summer Olympics
Judoka at the 1984 Summer Olympics
Olympic judoka of Canada
Sportspeople from Vancouver
Pan American Games gold medalists for Canada
Pan American Games bronze medalists for Canada
Pan American Games medalists in judo
Judoka at the 1975 Pan American Games
Judoka at the 1979 Pan American Games
Judoka at the 1983 Pan American Games
Medalists at the 1975 Pan American Games
Medalists at the 1979 Pan American Games
Medalists at the 1983 Pan American Games
20th-century Canadian people
21st-century Canadian people